The ruble (alternatively rubla or rouble; , , plural ruble;) is the currency of the internationally unrecognized state of Transnistria and is divided into 100 kopecks.

Since Transnistria is a polity with no credible international recognition and its territory is formally part of Moldova under Russian military occupation, its currency has no ISO 4217 code, and thus Transnistria cannot participate in any card payment processing network. However, unofficially some Transnistrian organisations, such as Agroprombank and Gazprombank, used the code PRB, a code reserved for Puerto Rico (ISO 3166-1 country code "PR"). The Transnistrian Republican Bank sometimes uses the code RUP, a code reserved for Russia (ISO 3166-1 country code "RU").

First ruble (1994)

Soviet banknotes were used in the Pridnestrovian Moldavian Republic after its formation in 1990. When the former Soviet republics began issuing their own currencies, Transnistria was flooded with Soviet rubles. In an attempt to protect its financial system, in July 1993, the Transnistrian government bought used Goznak-printed Soviet and Russian notes dated 1961–1992 and modified these notes by applying adhesive stamps bearing the image of General Alexander Vasilyevich Suvorov, founder of Tiraspol, and the notes' corresponding denomination. These stamped notes replaced unstamped Soviet and Russian notes at par. It is thought that most uncirculated notes bearing these stickers were created after 1994 specifically for collectors.

Second ruble (1994–2000)

The first, provisional issues were replaced in August 1994 by a new ruble, equal to 1,000 old rubles. This currency consisted solely of banknotes and suffered from high inflation, necessitating the issue of notes overstamped with higher denominations. Although issued in 1994, some notes (50 to 5,000 rubles) were issued dated 1993.

Banknotes

Third ruble (2000–present)

In 2000, a new ruble was introduced at a rate of 1 new ruble = 1,000,000 second rubles. This new currency consists of both coins and banknotes.

Coins

Coins are of 1 to 50 kopecks and are made from aluminium or copper-zinc and are similar to Soviet-era coinage. The 1 kopeck coins were withdrawn from circulation in January 2009.

On 22 August 2014, the Transnistrian Republican Bank issued coins made of composite materials and come in denominations of 1, 3, 5 and 10 rubles.

Commemorative coins

Since 2000, the Transnistrian Republican Bank has issued many commercial commemorative coins made from silver and gold. Their mintage numbers were very low, ranging between 500 and 5,000. Topics included for example "Ancient fortresses on the river Dniester", "The outstanding people of Transdniestria" and "Red book of Transdniestria". A complete listing can be found on the website of the "Transnistrian Republican Bank".

Mint

When it was founded, Transnistria did not have its own mint, thus a foreign mint had to be found to strike Transnistrian coins. The Mint of Poland (Mennica Polska) in Warsaw was selected. Coins dated 2000 were struck in Warsaw and transported via Ukraine to Transnistria in trucks belonging to the Transnistrian Republican Bank.

The Moldovan government was displeased with this situation, since they viewed it as a de facto recognition of Transnistria. In October 2001, Moldovan president Vladimir Voronin addressed the issue with his Polish counterpart.

The Polska Mennica (Mint of Poland) responded to the criticism by stating that because the Transnistrian ruble is not internationally recognized as a currency, they were producing tokens and not coins, which is normal business for mints.

The conflict came to a head when, in December 2004, Ukrainian customs confiscated a truck with US$117,000 worth of Transnistrian coins near Lviv. The coins were handed over to Moldovan authorities, who in response again protested with the Polish government.

The Polish Ministry of Foreign Affairs wrote another letter to Polska Mennica (Mint of Poland) in April 2005. They warned that continued production of Transnistrian coins would endanger relations with Ukraine and Moldova and damage the image of Poland abroad. The Polska Mennica (Mint of Poland) bowed to the pressure and cancelled its contract with Transnistria that same month.

For Transnistria there was then no other solution but to strike future coins themselves. Thus, on 18 November 2005, the Tiraspol Mint (Тираспольский монетный двор) was opened in the presence of President Igor Smirnov.

Banknotes

Notes are issued by the Transnistrian Republican Bank (Приднестровский Республиканский Банк) in 2000 as part of a currency reform, with 1 ruble equal to 1 million (1,000,000) old rubles. The notes come in denominations of 1, 5, 10, 25, 50, 100, 200 and 500 rubles.

2000 Series

2007 Series

In 2007, a new series replaced the above banknotes of denominations 1 to 100 rubles. The new notes have the same themes but a new design and improved security features.

Commemorative banknotes
Along with the issuance of banknotes for general circulation, the Transnistrian Republican Bank also issues commemorative banknotes focusing on the country's history and events relating to its development as an independent nation. The commemorative banknotes consist of an overprint applied on the note and are issued both for general circulation and also sold in limited numbers for the numismatic market.

Exchange rates
The currency is de facto pegged to the United States dollar. The central bank determines each workday whether it is appropriate to devalue the currency against the US dollar.

As of 20 March 2019
(Transnistrian ruble per foreign currency unit)
US dollar: 16.1000 rubles
Euro: 18.2816 rubles
Russian ruble: 0.2503 rubles
Moldovan leu: 0.9169 rubles

On 11 February 2009, the exchange rate was set to 9 Transnistrian rubles per dollar. It was changed to 9.40 rubles on 5 March 2010, 9.80 on 24 September 2010, and 10.20 on 14 December 2010. By 2013, the value of the ruble had dropped to 11.10 rubles per dollar. This was further changed to 11.30 per dollar on 16 March 2016. On 17 June 2017, the currency was devalued to 15 rubles per dollar. It was set to 16 per dollar on 12 January 2018. The most recent change was made on 5 April 2018, when it was set to 16.10 rubles per dollar.

Acceptance outside Transnistria
The Transnistrian ruble is generally not accepted as currency outside of Transnistria, although some bus companies with connections to Tiraspol accept the Transnistrian ruble at the Chișinău bus station as well as local shops in Varnița.

References

External links
 Pridnestrovie's own currency
 Central Bank of PMR (official website)
 Banknotes of Transnistria (Detailed Catalog)
 
 The banknotes of Transnistria 

1994 establishments in Moldova
Currencies introduced in 1994
Currencies of Moldova
Currencies of Transnistria